Accentuate the Positive may refer to:
"Ac-Cent-Tchu-Ate the Positive", 1944 song by Harold Arlen and Johnny Mercer
Accentuate the Positive (Bing Crosby album) (1962)
Accentuate the Positive (Al Jarreau album) (2004)